Hwin is a fictional character from C. S. Lewis's fantasy series The Chronicles of Narnia. She is prominent in the 1954 book The Horse and His Boy.

Hwin, a mare, was born as a free talking beast in the Land of Narnia, but was captured as a foal by the Calormenes, and has lived her life as the property of humans, hiding her true nature as a talking horse.  However, to prevent her mistress, Aravis Tarkheena, from committing suicide (to escape an arranged marriage), Hwin has revealed her true nature to Aravis, and has persuaded Aravis to flee with her to freedom in Narnia instead.  In The Horse and his Boy, (the events of which all occur during the reign of the four Pevensie children in Narnia, an era which begins and ends in the last chapter of The Lion, the Witch and the Wardrobe), Hwin and Aravis fall into company with the talking stallion, Bree, to whom Hwin is distantly related, and the boy Shasta.  In the course of their adventures, the companions thwart an attempted invasion of Archenland and Narnia, and Hwin, nervous, gentle and humble by nature, passes through testing grounds in which courage is developed in her.

Name 
Hwin's name brings to mind the word "whinny", a sound that horses make.  Primarily, "Hwin" is a contraction of "Hwinhynym", which, spelled "Houyhnhnm" is the name of the race of noble horses from Jonathan Swift's Gulliver's Travels.

Biographical summary

Prior story 
Hwin was born in Narnia, but was captured as a foal and sold into slavery in Calormen. She became the property of Aravis Tarkeena, a member of the ruling class in Calormen. During her years in slavery, Hwin did not speak, in order to hide her Narnian origin. However, not long before the appearance of Hwin and Aravis in The Horse and His Boy, Hwin has revealed her nature as a talking horse to Aravis, while intervening to prevent Aravis from killing herself to avoid an arranged marriage. Hwin has persuaded Aravis that they should escape together to the free land of Narnia.

In The Horse and His Boy 
In this chapter, Hwin and Aravis make their first appearance in the story, driven together with Bree and Shasta by roaring lions. Hwin looks up to Bree as "a noble war horse", and prefers to accept his "assistance and protection" on their journey. Although Aravis is the acknowledged leader of the Aravis-Hwin pair, Hwin defends her right to compare escape stories with Bree: "No, I won't [be silent], Aravis. This is my escape just as much as yours." Hwin and Bree discover that they know the same places in Narnia, and that they are  possibly distantly related.

Hwin also plays a vital role in their escape through Tashbaan, but her plan of disguising themselves fails when King Edmund of Narnia mistakes Shasta for Prince Corin of Archenland and Aravis is recognised by a friend. Eventually, the group reunite and head to Archenland.

Hwin remains friends with Bree, Shasta (who is later revealed to be Prince Cor of Archenland, Prince Corin's long-lost twin) and Aravis throughout her life, and it is mentioned that she later marries (though not to Bree).

Personality
Hwin's logical thinking and humility serve as the counter to Bree.

Hwin is generally very clear-thinking and reasonable, and though she seems a bit shy at times, her advice is usually the smartest of the group's; it is she, for example, who devises the best plan for getting through Tashbaan (though it doesn't work well for reasons beyond their control). Her wisdom is to be compared to Bree, who is somewhat less sensible and not quite as wise. He also seems to be more concerned than her with what others would think of him—for example, that the other Talking Horses might think his rolling in the grass is silly, while she replies she enjoys it and doesn't care what others think.

See also
 List of fictional horses

References

 
 
 
 

Literary characters introduced in 1954
Fictional horses
The Chronicles of Narnia characters
Talking animals in fiction